The building at 14 Maple Avenue in Windsor, Connecticut is a Former Fire Station of the town.  It was built about 1882, and was the town's first purpose-built firehouse.  Now converted to commercial use, it was listed on the National Register of Historic Places in 1988.

Description and history
Windsor's former fire station stands far back on the north side of Maple Avenue, with a small parking area in front and buildings facing Broad Street to its east.  It is a brick structure, 2-1/2 stories in height.  On its main facade, the former garage entrance for the fire truck, which was an elliptically arched opening, has been filled in with a square plate glass window and brickwork filling the arch above.  The main doorway is to the right, set in a rectangular opening along with a four-light transom window; it is also topped by a blind arch.  Above these, and extending into the gable, is a three-part Palladian window, each section with a round-arch top.  The front gable eave is adorned with brick dentil work.  The west side wall is topped by a small gabled wall dormer.

The station was built about 1882 on land donated by H. Sidney Hayden.  In addition to being the town's first fire station, it is a fine local example of Victorian styling in brick.  It served as a fire station until 1939, and was converted to commercial use in 1973.  It is now the home of Gottier Investments.

See also
National Register of Historic Places listings in Hartford County, Connecticut

References

Fire stations on the National Register of Historic Places in Connecticut
National Register of Historic Places in Hartford County, Connecticut
Windsor, Connecticut
Buildings and structures in Hartford County, Connecticut
Fire stations completed in 1882
Italianate architecture in Connecticut
Defunct fire stations in Connecticut